Kétegyháza is a large village in Békés County, in the Southern Great Plain region of south-east Hungary. It is one of the main centres of Hungary's Romanian minority.

Jews lived in the village in the 19th century and in 1944 many of them were murdered in the Holocaust of the Jews of Hungary.

Notable people
 Sándor Márki - historiographer, professor
 József Kalcsó – painter
 Imre Mudin – athlete, Olympic participant
 István Mudin – athlete, flagbearer of Hungary at the 1908 Olympics, older brother of Imre
 Aurel Suciu - signatory of the Transylvanian Memorandum

Tourist sights
 Machine museum - collection of agricultural machinery and equipment
 Romanian country house
 Jewish Cemetery

References

External links

  in Hungarian

Populated places in Békés County
Romanian communities in Hungary
Jewish communities destroyed in the Holocaust